Temperance may refer to:

Moderation

Temperance movement, movement to reduce the amount of alcohol consumed
Temperance (virtue), habitual moderation in the indulgence of a natural appetite or passion

Culture
Temperance (group), Canadian dance-pop musical group
Temperance (Tarot card), Major Arcana Tarot card
Temperance, album by Astrud Gilberto
Temperance Brennan, fictional character by Kathy Reichs 
Temperance "Bones" Brennan, fictional character of TV series Bones
Temperance (Italian band), Italian melodic metal group
Temperance (album), 2014 debut album by the Italian band

Places

United States
Temperance, Georgia, an unincorporated community
Temperance Bell, Georgia, an unincorporated community
Temperance, Michigan, a community
Temperance Hall, Tennessee, a small community
Temperance Island, Lake Michigan
Temperance River, Minnesota

Other places
 Temperance Vale, New Brunswick, Canada
 Temperance Town, Cardiff, Wales

See also
 Temperance bar, bars of the temperance movement opposed to alcohol
 Temperance Hall (disambiguation)
 
 

Virtue names